Abdulmejid I (25 April 182325 June 1861) was the 31st Sultan of the Ottoman Empire and succeeded his father Mahmud II on 2 July 1839. His reign was notable for the rise of nationalist movements within the empire's territories. Abdulmejid wanted to encourage Ottomanism among secessionist subject nations and stop rising nationalist movements within the empire, but despite new laws and reforms to integrate non-Muslims and non-Turks more thoroughly into Ottoman society, his efforts failed in this regard.

He tried to forge alliances with the major powers of Western Europe, namely the United Kingdom and France, who fought alongside the Ottoman Empire in the Crimean War against Russia. During the Congress of Paris on 30 March 1856, the Ottoman Empire was officially included among the European family of nations.

Abdulmejid's biggest achievement was the announcement and application of the Tanzimat (reorganization) reforms which were prepared by his father and effectively started the modernization of the Ottoman Empire in 1839. For this achievement, one of the imperial anthems of the Ottoman Empire, the March of Abdulmejid, was named after him.

Early life 

Abdulmejid was born on 25 April 1823 at the Beşiktaş Palace or at the Topkapı Palace, in Istanbul. His mother was his father's first wife in 1839, Valide sultan Bezmiâlem, originally named Suzi (1807–1853), either a Circassian or Georgian slave.

Abdulmejid received a European education and spoke fluent French, being the first sultan to do so.  Like Abdülaziz who succeeded him, he was interested in literature and classical music. Like his father Mahmud II, he was an advocate of reforms and was lucky enough to have the support of progressive viziers such as Mustafa Reşit Pasha, Mehmet Emin Ali Paşa and Fuad Pasha. Abdulmejid was also the first sultan to directly listen to the public's complaints on special reception days, which were usually held every Friday without any middlemen. Abdulmejid toured the empire's territories to see in person how the Tanzimat reforms were being applied.  He travelled to İzmit, Mudanya, Bursa, Gallipoli, Çanakkale, Lemnos, Lesbos and Chios in 1844 and toured the Balkan provinces in 1846.

Reign 
When Abdulmejid succeeded to the throne on 2 July 1839 when he was only sixteen, he was young and inexperienced, the affairs of the Ottoman Empire were in a critical state. At the time his father died at the start of the Egyptian–Ottoman War, the news reached Istanbul that the empire's army had just been defeated at Nizip by the army of the rebel Egyptian viceroy, Muhammad Ali. At the same time, the empire's fleet was on its way to Alexandria, where it was handed over to Muhammad Ali by its commander Ahmed Fevzi Pasha, on the pretext that the young sultan's advisers had sided with Russia. However, through the intervention of the European powers during the Oriental Crisis of 1840, Muhammad Ali was obliged to come to terms, and the Ottoman Empire was saved from further attacks while its territories in Syria, Lebanon and Palestine were restored. The terms were finalised at the Convention of London (1840).

 Egyptian governor Mehmed Ali Pasha, who came to Istanbul as the official invitation of the sultan on 19 July 1846, was shown privileged hospitality by the sultan and the vükela (government ministers). So much so that the old vizier built the Galata bridge in 1845 so that he could drive between Beșiktaș Palace and Bab-ı Ali. 

In compliance with his father's express instructions, Abdulmejid immediately carried out the reforms to which Mahmud II had devoted himself. In November 1839 an edict known as the Hatt-ı Șerif of Gülhane, also known as Tanzimat Fermanı was proclaimed, consolidating and enforcing these reforms. The edict was supplemented at the close of the Crimean War by a similar statute issued in February 1856, named the Ottoman Reform Edict of 1856 (Islâhat Hatt-ı Hümâyûnu). By these enactments it was provided that all classes of the sultan's subjects should have their lives and property protected; that taxes should be fairly imposed and justice impartially administered; and that all should have full religious liberty and equal civil rights. The scheme met with strong opposition from the Muslim governing classes and the ulema, or religious authorities, and was only partially implemented, especially in the more remote parts of the empire. More than one conspiracy was formed against the sultan's life on account of it.

Among measures promoted by Abdulmejid were:
 Introduction of the first Ottoman paper banknotes (1840)
 Reorganisation of the army, including the introduction of conscription (1842–1844)
 Adoption of an Ottoman national anthem and Ottoman national flag (1844)
 Reorganisation of the finance system according to the French model
 Reorganisation of the Civil and Criminal Code according to the French model
 Reorganisation of the court system, establishing a system of civil and criminal courts with both European and Ottoman judges.
 Establishment of the Meclis-i Maarif-i Umumiye (1845) which was the prototype of the First Ottoman Parliament (1876)
 Institution of a council of public instruction (1846)
 Creation of the Ministry of Education
 According to legend, plans to send humanitarian aid of £10,000 (£1,225,053.76 in 2019) to Ireland during its Great Famine, but later agreed to reduce it to £1,000 (£122,505.38 in 2019) at the insistence of either his own ministers or British diplomats to avoid violating protocol by giving more than Queen Victoria, who had made a donation of £2,000.
 Plans to abolish slave markets (1847)
 Plans to build a Protestant chapel (1847)
 Establishment of modern universities and academies (1848)
 Establishment of an Ottoman school in Paris
 Abolition of a capitation tax which imposed higher tariffs on non-Muslims (1856)
 Non-Muslims were allowed to become soldiers in the Ottoman army (1856)
 Various provisions for the better administration of the public service and for the advancement of commerce
 New land laws confirming the right of ownership (1858)

Another notable reform was that the turban was officially outlawed for the first time during Abdulmejid's reign, in favour of the fez. European fashions were also adopted by the Court. (The fez would be banned in 1925 by the same Republican National Assembly that abolished the sultanate and proclaimed the Turkish Republic in 1923).

According to the memoirs of Cyrus Hamlin, Samuel Morse received an Order of Glory for his contributions to the telegraph, which was issued by Sultan Abdulmejid who personally tested Morse's new invention.

When Kossuth and others sought refuge in Turkey after the failure of the Hungarian uprising in 1849, the sultan was called on by Austria and Russia to surrender them, but he refused. He also would not allow the conspirators against his own life to be put to death. The 1911 Encyclopædia Britannica says of him, "He bore the character of being a kind and honourable man, if somewhat weak and easily led. Against this, however, must be set down his excessive extravagance, especially towards the end of his life."

In 1844 he created the Ottoman lira and in 1851 he instituted the Order of the Medjidie.

The Ottoman Empire received the first of its foreign loans on 25 August 1854 during the Crimean War. This major foreign loan was followed by those of 1855, 1858 and 1860, which culminated in default and led to the alienation of European sympathy from the Ottoman Empire and indirectly to the later dethronement and death of Abdulmejid's brother Abdülaziz.

On the one hand, financial imperfections, and on the other hand, the discontent caused by the wide privileges given to the non-Muslim subjects again led the country to confusion. Incidents took place in Jeddah in 1857 and in Montenegro in 1858. The major European states have taken the opportunity to intervene in their own interests. The Ottoman statesmen, who panicked in the face of this situation, started following a policy that fulfilled their every wish. The fact that Abdulmejid could not prevent this situation further increased the dissatisfaction caused by the Edict of Tanzimat.

The opponents decided to eliminate Abdulmejid and put Abdulaziz on the throne in order to prevent the European states from acting like a guardian. Upon a notice, this revolt attempt, which was referred to as the Kuleli Foundation in history, was suppressed before it even started on 14 September 1859.  Meanwhile, the financial situation deteriorated and foreign debts, which were taken under heavy conditions to cover the costs of war, placed a burden on the treasury. All of the debts received from Beyoğlu consumers exceeded eighty million gold liras. Some of the debt securities and hostages were taken by foreign traders and bankers. The Grand Vizier  who criticized this situation harshly, was dismissed by the sultan on 18 October 1859.

His success in foreign relations was not as notable as his domestic accomplishments. His reign started off with the defeat of his forces by the Viceroy of Egypt and the subsequent signing of the Convention of London (1840), which saved his empire from a greater embarrassment. The Ottomans successfully participated in the Crimean War and were winning signatories at the Treaty of Paris (1856). His attempts at strengthening his base in the Balkans failed in Bosnia and Montenegro, and in 1861 he was forced to give up Lebanon by the Concert of Europe.

Although he emphasized his commitment to the ceremonial rules imposed by his ancestors at the ceremonies reflected outside, he adopted radical changes in the life of the palace.  For example, he completely abandoned the Topkapı Palace, which was a place for four centuries, about the Ottoman dynasty.  The traditions of the British, French, Italian troops and officers and diplomats who came to Istanbul during the Crimean War (1853-1856) directed even middle-class families to consumerism and luxury. 

Between 1847 and 1849 he had repairs made to the Hagia Sophia mosque, and was responsible for the construction of the Dolmabahçe Palace. He also founded the first French Theatre in Istanbul.

Many reconstruction activities were also carried out during the reign of Abdulmecid.  Palaces and mansions were built with some of the borrowed money.  Dolmabahçe Palace (1853), Beykoz Pavilion (1855), Küçüksu Pavilion (1857), Küçük Mecidiye Mosque (1849), Teșvikiye Mosque (1854) are among the main architectural works of the period.  Again in this period, as was done by Bezmiâlem Sultan's Gureba Hospital (1845-1846), the new Galata Bridge was put into service on the same date.  In addition, many fountains, mosques, lodges and similar social institutions were repaired or rebuilt.

Death

Abdulmejid died of tuberculosis (like his father) at the age of 38 on 25 June 1861 in Istanbul, and was buried in Yavuz Selim Mosque, and was succeeded by his younger half-brother Sultan Abdülaziz, son of Pertevniyal Sultan. At the time of his death, Abdulmejid had one legal wife and queen consort, Perestu Kadın, and many concubines.

Family 
Abdülmejid had one of the most numerous  harem of the  dynasty. He is known to be the first sultan whose harem was not composed of slave girls but, due to the progressive abolition of slavery in the Ottoman Empire, of girls of free birth, noble or bourgeois, sent to the sultan by the will of the families. He was also the first sultan whose harem assumed a definitive hierarchical structure which included four Kadın, followed by four Ikbal, four gödze and a variable number of minor concubines.

Consorts 
Abdülmejid I had at least twenty-six consorts, but only two were also legal wives:
 Servetseza Kadin (1823 - 24 September 1878).  BaşKadin (First consort), born Princess Temruko. She had no children because Abdülmejid was not attracted to her, but he respected her and entrusted her to raise his children Mehmed V Reşad, Fatma Sultan and Refia Sultan when they lost their mother. Servetseza also loved Murad V as her own son. 
 Hoşyar Kadin (1825 - 1849). Also called Huşyar Kadın. Second Kadın. She was daughter of the Georgian nobleman Zurab Bey Tuskia. She entered the harem in 1839. She had a daughter. Her sister was the third treasurer of the harem and was highly respected. She died in 1849 of turberculosis.
  Şevkefza Kadın (12 December 1820 - 17 September 1889). Second Kadın after Hoşyar's death. She was of Circassian origin and was raised by Nurtab Kadın, a consort of Mahmud II (father of Abdülmecid). She was mother and Valide sultan of Murad V and a daughter.
 Tirimüjgan Kadın (16 October 1819 - 3 October 1852). Third Kadın. She was a Circassian and worked as palace servant when she was noticed by the sultan and he taken her as his consort. She was the mother of two sons, including  Abdülhamid II, and a daughter.
 Verdicenan Kadın (1825 - 1889). Born Princess Saliha Açba, she married Abdülmejid for political purposes. Mother of a son and daughter and she adopted Mediha Sultan after her mother died. She was the aunt of the famous poet Leyla Açba, who was also her lady-in-waiting.
 Gülcemal Kadin (1826 - 1851). Fourth Kadın. Bosnian, she was the mother of  Mehmed VI and three daughters.
 Şayan Kadın (1829 - 1860). Fourth Kadın after Gülcemal's death. She was Circassian, born in Sochi, and her mother was a Kucba princess. As a consort she used her power to help the Caucasian refugees. She lived in the palace with her mother. She had no children, but she adopted Behice Sultan when she lost her mother.
 Gülistu Kadın (1830 - 1861). Fourth Kadın after Şayan's death. Called also Gülustu Kadin. Born Princess Fatma Çaçba. She was the favorite daughter-in-law of Bezmiâlem Sultan, Abdülmejid's mother. She was the mother of Mehmed VI and three daughters.
 Rahime Perestu Kadin (1830 - 1906). She was the adopted daughter of Esma Sultan, daughter of Abdülhamid I, and was the first Abdülmejid's legal wives. Fourth Kadin after Gülistu's death. She had no children, but she was the adoptive mother of Abdülhamid II and Cemile Sultan.
 Bezmiara Kadin (? - 1909). Called also Bezmican or Bezmi. Fifth Kadın, an honorary title that was bestowed upon her as second legal wife. Adopted from a noble family, she never adapted to the harem and divorced the sultan, the first woman to do so. By sultan, she had a daughter who died as newborn. She later married twice more, and had a daughter with her second husband.
 Mahitab Kadin (1830 - 1888). Also called Mehtab Kadın. Chechen, she was one of Abdülmejid's favorite consorts, she was therefore conferred the honorary title of Fifth Kadın. She is the mother of a son and a daughter.
 Düzdidil Hanim (1826 - 18 August 1845). BaşIkbal or Third Kadin. Abkhaz, she had grown up at court under the tutelage of the chief treasurer. She was the mother of four daughters from whom she had to separate because she fell ill with tuberculosis and she had to be isolated and entrusted to her cousin Cican Hanim.
 Nükhetseza Hanim (2 January 1827 - 15 May 1850). BaşIkbal after Düzdidil's death. Abkhazian and Georgian, her true name was Hatice. She was the mother of two sons and two daughters. She died of tuberculosis.
 Neveser Hanim (1841 - 1889). BaşIkbal after Nükhetseza's death. Abkhaza, daughter of the noble Abazin Misost Bey Eşba, her true name was Esma Eşba. She had intense green eyes. She entered the palace in 1853 and was educated there for five years before becoming a consort. She had no children, but adopted Şehzade Mehmed Burhaneddin after his mother's death. A lover of horseback riding, the sultan built a pavilion for her behind the Dolmabahçe Palace where she could rest after her outings, and finally moved there permanently there, while during the reign of Abdülhamid II she occupied a pavilion of the Yıldiz palace. Her niece Şemsinur Hanım entered the service of Emine Nazikeda Kadın, First Consort of  Mehmed VI.
 Zeynifelek Hanim (1824 - 20 December 1842). Second Ikbal. Also called Zerrinmelek. Born Princess Klıç, she was abaza. She grew up in the palace with her sister and cousins and was chosen as a consort by Bezmiâlem Sultan. She had a daughter. She died of tuberculosis.
 Nesrin Hanim (1826 - 2 January 1853). Second Ikbal after Zeynifelek's death. She was the daughter of the Georgian nobleman Manuçar Bey Asemiani, she was the mother of three sons and a daughter. She died of pain after three of them died.
 Ceylanyar Hanim (1830 - 27 December 1855). Second Ikbal after Nesrin's death. Circassian, her true name was Nafiye. She was the mother of a son.
 Serfiraz Hanim (1837 - 25 June 1905). Second Ikbal after Ceylanyar's death. Born Princess Ayşe Liah (or Lakh). One of Abdülmejid's favorite consorts, she fell out of favor after a scandal that saw her in love with an Armenian boy. She had two sons and a daughter.
 Nalandil Hanim (1823 - 1865). Third Ikbal or BaşIkbal. Circassian of the Ubuh tribe, she was the daughter of Prince Çıpakue Natikhu Bey. She is the mother of a son and two daughters. Her sister, Terbiye Hanim, was the treasurer of the harem.
 Navekimisal Hanim (1827 - 1854). Fourth Ikbal. Also called Navekivisal. Born Princess Biberd. She had a daughter. She died of tuberculosis.
 Nergizev Hanim (1830 - 26 October 1848/1858). Also called Nergizu Hanim or Nergis Hanim, she was a Circassian from the tribe of Natuhay. Mother of a son, she died of tuberculosis.
 Şayeste Hanim (1838 - 11 February 1912). Abkhaza, Princess Inalipa. She was the mother of a son and daughter, and the adoptive mother of Mehmed VI. She was known to be constantly in debt.
 Çeşmiferah Hanım. No information about her other than her name is kept. Princess Mülkicihan Achba descrived her as tall and blonde. 
 Hüsnicenan Hanim (1818 - 1843). She was Abdülmecid's first concubine, when he was still Şehzade. He set aside her when he ascended the throne. She died of tuberculosis.
 Safderun Hanım (1845 - 1893). Daughter of a Circassian princess. One of her last consorts and one of Abdülmecid's favorites in his later years, fell out of favor after his death: Abdülaziz suspended her salary until 1877 and Abdülhamid II halved it. She died in her home in Kadıköy.
 Yıldız Hanım (1842 - 1880). One of the last consorts and one of Abdülmecid's favorites in his later years. She initially lived in a reserved wing of the Çırağan palace, and then in a reserved pavilion near the Dolmabahçe palace, because she refused to live with his other consorts. She was elder sister of Safinaz Nurefsun Kadın, second consort of Abdulmejid's son Abdülhamid II. The Yıldız Palace built by Abdülhamid II was named in her honor.

Sons 
Abdülmecid had at least nineteen sons:
 Murad V (21 September 1840 - 29 August 1904) - with Şevkefza Kadın. 33rd Sultan of the Ottoman Empire.
 Şehzade Mehmed Ziyaeddin (22 April 1842 - 27 April 1845) - with Nesrin Hanim. Buried in the Yeni Cami.
 Abdülhamid II (21 September 1842 - 10 February 1918) - with Tirimüjgan Kadın. After his mother's death he was adopted by Rahime Perestu Kadin. 34th Sultan of the Ottoman Empire.
  Mehmed V Reşad (2 November 1844 - 3 July 1918) - with Gülcemal Kadin. After his mother's death he was adopted by Servetseza Kadin. 35th Sultan of the Ottoman Empire.
 Şehzade Ahmed (5 June 1846 - 6 June 1846) - with Nükhetseza Hanim. Born in the Çırağan Palace, buried in the Yeni Cami. His father was in Rumelia at the time of his birth, and he came back when he receveid the news of Ahmed's death. 
 Şehzade Mehmed Abid (22 April 1848 - 7 May 1848) - with Tirimüjgan Kadın. Born in the Çırağan Palace, buried in the Yeni Cami.
 Şehzade Mehmed Fuad (7 July 1848 - 28 September 1848) - with Nergivez Hanim. Born in the Çırağan Palace, buried in the Yeni Cami.
 Şehzade Ahmed Kemaleddin (16 July 1848 - 25 April 1905) - with Verdicenan Kadin. He had a consort and two daughters. 
 Şehzade Mehmed Burhaneddin (23 May 1849 - 4 November 1876) - with Nükhetseza Hanim. After his mother's death he was adopted by Neverser Hanim. He married three times and had a son and a daughter.
 Şehzade Mehmed Vamik (19 April 1850 - 6 August 1850) - unknown mother. Buried in the Yeni Cami.
 Şehzade Mehmed Bahaeddin (24 June 1850 - 9 November 1852) - with Nesrin Hanim. Twin of Şehzade Nizameddin. Buried in the Yeni Cami.
 Şehzade Mehmed Nizameddin (24 June 1850 - 1852/1853) - with Nesrin Hanim. Twin of Şehzade Bahaeddin. Buried in the Yeni Cami.
 Şehzade Ahmed Nureddin (31 March 1852 - 3 January 1884) - with Mahitab Kadın. He married once, but no had issue.  
 Şehzade Mehmed Rüşdi (31 March 1852 - 5 December 1852) - with Ceylanyar Hanim. Born in the Çırağan Palace, buried in the Abdülhamid I mausoleum.
 Şehzade Osman Safiyeddin (9 June 1852 - 2 July 1855) - with Serfiraz Hanim. Born in the Çırağan Palace, buried in the Yavuz Selim mosque.
 Şehzade Abdullah (3 February 1853 - 3 February 1853) - with Şayeste Hanim.
 Şehzade Mehmed Abdülsamed (20 March 1853 - 5 May 1855) - with Nalandil Hanim. Buried in the Yavuz Selim mosque.
 Şehzade Selim Süleyman (25 July 1860 - 16 July 1909) - with Serfiraz Hanim. He had five consorts, two sons and a daughter.
  Mehmed VI Vahideddin (14 January 1861 - 16 May 1926) - with Gülistu Kadın. Orphan by birth, he was adopted by Şayeste Hanim. 36th and last Sultan of the Ottoman Empire.

Daughters 
Abdülmecid I had at least twenty-seven daughters:
 Mevhibe Sultan (9 May 1840 - 9 February 1841) - with Hoşyar Kadin. Buried in Abdülhamid I türbe. 
 Naime Sultan (11 October 1840 - 1 May 1843) - with Tirimüjgan Kadın. Born in the Topkapi Palace, buried in Mustafa III türbe.
  Fatma Sultan (1 November 1840 - 26 August 1884) - with Gülcemal Kadin. After her mother's death she was adopted by Servetseza Kadın. She married twice and had a son and two daughters.
 Behiye Sultan (22 February 1841 - 3 August 1847) - with Zeynifelek Hanim. Called also Behi Sultan. Buried in Yeni Cami. 
 Neyire Sultan (13 October 1841 - 14 January 1844) - with Düzdidil Hanim. Twin of Münire Sultan. Born in the Beşiktaş Palace, buried in Nurosmaniye.  
 Münire Sultan (13 October 1841 - 18 December 1841) - with Düzdidil Hanim. Twin of Neyire Sultan. Born in the Beşiktaş Palace, buried in Nurosmaniye.
 Aliye Sultan (1842 - 1842) - with Nükhetseza Hanim. Born in the  Çırağan Palace. 
 Hatice Sultan (7 February 1842 - 1842) - with Gülcemal Kadin. Twin of Refia Sultan.
 Refia Sultan (7 February 1842 - 4 January 1880) - with Gülcemal Kadin. Twin sister of Hatice Sultan. After her mother's death she was adopted by Servetseza Kadın. She married once and a daughter.
 Aliye Sultan (20 October 1842 - 10 July 1845) - with Şevkefza Kadın. Born in the Beşiktaş Palace, buried in Yeni Cami.
 Cemile Sultan (17 August 1843 - 26 February 1915) - with Düzdidil Hanim. After her mother's death she was adopted by Rahime Perestu Kadın. She married once and had three sons and three daughters.
 Münire Sultan (9 December 1844 - 29 June 1862) - with Verdicenan Kadin. She married twice.
 Samiye Sultan (23 February 1845 - 15 April 1845) - with Düzdidil Hanim. Born in the Topkapi Palace, buried in Yeni Cami.
 Fatma Nazime Sultan (26 November 1847 - 1 December 1847) - with Nükhetseza Hanim. Born in the Beylerbeyi Palace, buried in Yeni Cami.
 Sabiha Sultan (15 April 1848 - 27 April 1849) - with Mahitab Kadin. Born in the Çırağan Palace, buried in Yeni Cami.
 Behice Sultan (6 August 1848 - 30 November 1876) - with Nesrin Hamın. After her mother's death she was adopted by Şayan Kadin. She married Halil Hamid Paşazade Hamid Bey but died of tuberculosis only 14 days after the wedding.
 Mukbile Sultan (9 February 1850 - 25 February 1850) - with Bezmiara Kadin. Born in the Çırağan Palace, buried in Yeni Cami.
 Rukiye Sultan (1850 - 1850)
 Seniha Sultan (5 December 1851 - 15 September 1931) - with Nalandil Hanım. She married once and had two sons.
 Zekiye Sultan (26 February 1855 - 19 February 1856) - with Gülistu Kadın. Twin of Fehime Sultan. Buried in Gülistu Kadın türbe.
 Fehime Sultan (26 February 1855 - November 10, 1856) - with Gülistu Kadın. Twin of Zekiye Sultan. Buried in Gülistu Kadın türbe. 
 Şehime Sultan (1 March 1855 - 21 May 1857) - with Nalandil Hanim. Born in the Beylerbeyi Palace, buried in Gülistu Kadın türbe.
 Mediha Sultan (39 July 1856 - 9 November 1928) - with Gülistu Kadin. Adopted by Verdicenan Kadın After her mother's death. She married twice and had a son.
 Naile Sultan (30 September 1856 - 18 January 1882) - with Şayeste Hanım. Called also Nadile Sultan. She married once without issue.
 Bedihe Sultan (30 September 1857 - 12 July 1858) - with Serfiraz Hanım. Also called Bedia Sultan. Born in the Beşiktaş Palace, buried in Gülistu Kadın türbe.
 Atiyetullah Sultan (16 December 1858 - 16 December 1858).
 (Fülane) Sultan (30 May 1860 - 30 May 1860).

Honours 
  1851: Founder of the Order of the Medjidie;
  1856: Grand Cross of the Tower and Sword;
  5 November 1856: Stranger Knight of the Garter;
 20 March 1860: Grand Cordon of the Order of Leopold;
 Grand Cross of the Legion of Honour.

In fiction 
 A fictionalized version of Abdulmejid I appears in the 2008 novel The Bellini Card, by Jason Goodwin.

References

Sources

External links 

1823 births
1861 deaths
People of the Revolutions of 1848
19th-century Ottoman sultans
Turks from the Ottoman Empire
19th-century deaths from tuberculosis
Tuberculosis deaths in the Ottoman Empire
Extra Knights Companion of the Garter
Grand Croix of the Légion d'honneur
Abdulmejid I